The Noctuidae, commonly known as owlet moths, cutworms or armyworms, are a family of moths. They are considered the most controversial family in the superfamily Noctuoidea because many of the clades are constantly changing, along with the other families of the Noctuoidea. It was considered the largest family in Lepidoptera for a long time, but after regrouping Lymantriinae, Catocalinae and Calpinae within the family Erebidae, the latter holds this title now. Currently, Noctuidae is the second largest family in Noctuoidea, with about 1,089 genera and 11,772 species. This classification is still contingent, as more changes continue to appear between Noctuidae and Erebidae.

Description

Adult: Most noctuid adults have drab wings, but some subfamilies, such as Acronictinae and Agaristinae, are very colorful, especially those from tropical regions (e.g. Baorisa hieroglyphica). They are characterized by a structure in the metathorax called the nodular sclerite or epaulette, which separates the tympanum and the conjunctiva in the tympanal organ. It functions to keep parasites (Acari) out of the tympanal cavity. Another characteristic in this group is trifine hindwing venation, by reduction or absence of the second medial vein (M2).

Markings present on the wings of noctuid adults can be helpful in distinguishing species.  From the basal location to the outer edge (proximal to distal) on the forewing, there is a claviform (club-shaped) stigma, horizontally oriented with the thicker end closer to the wing's outer edge, located posterior to a discal (round) stigma.  These are followed distally by a reniform (kidney-shaped) stigma, which is typically oriented with its concave side facing the wing's outer edge.  It is often not possible to discern all of the stigmata on all specimens or species.  Crossbands or crosslines may be present, oriented longitudinally from the leading to the trailing edge of the wing.

Larva: Commonly green or brown; some species present bright colors, such as the camphorweed cucullia moth (Cucullia alfarata). Most are pudgy and smooth with rounded short heads and few setae, but there are some exceptions in some subfamilies (e.g. Acronictinae and Pantheinae).

Pupa: The pupae most often range from shiny brown to dark brown. When they newly pupate they are bright brownish orange, but after a few days start to get darker.

Eggs: Vary in colors, but all have a spherical shape.

Etymology

The word Noctuidae is derived from the name of the type genus Noctua, which is the Latin name for the little owl, and the patronymic suffix -idae used typically to form taxonomic family names in animals.

The common name "owlet" originally means a small or young owl. The names "armyworms" and "cutworms" are based on the behavior of the larvae of this group, which can occur in destructive swarms and cut the stems of plants.

Ecology

Distribution and diversity

This family is cosmopolitan and can be found worldwide except in the Antarctic region. Some species, such as the setaceous Hebrew character (Xestia c-nigrum), can be found in the Arctic Circle, specifically in the Yukon territory of western Canada, with an elevation 1,702 m above sea level, where the temperature fluctuates between 23/-25 °C (73/-13 °F). Many species of dart moths have been recorded in elevations as high as 4,000 m above sea level (e.g. Xestia elisabetha).
Among the places where the number of species has been counted are North America and northern Mexico, with about 2,522 species. 1,576 species are found in Europe, while the other species are distributed worldwide.

Mutualism

Members of Noctuidae, like other butterflies and moths, perform an important role in plant pollination. Some species have developed a stronger connection with their host plants. For example, the lychnis moth (Hadena bicruris) has a strange mutualistic relationship with pink plants or carnation plants (Caryophyllaceae), in that larvae feed on the plant while the adults pollinate the flowers.

Food guilds
Herbivory: Caterpillars of most Noctuidae feed on plants; some feed on poisonous plants and are unaffected by their chemical defences; for example, the splendid brocade moth (Lacanobia splendens) feeds on cowbane (Cicuta virosa), a plant that is notoriously toxic to vertebrates.

Predation and cannibalism: During the larval stage, some cutworms readily feed on other insects. One such species is the shivering pinion (Lithophane querquera), whose larvae commonly feed on other lepidopteran larvae. Moreover, many noctuid larvae, such as those of the fall armyworm (Spodoptera frugiperda) and of genera such as Heliothis and Helicoverpa, aggressively eat their siblings and often other species of caterpillar.

Nectarivory and puddling: Like many Lepidoptera, many species of adult Noctuidae visit flowers for their nectar. They also seek other liquid food resources such as plant juices, honeydew, dung, urea and mud, among others.

As is common in members of the order Lepidoptera, courtship in many Noctuidae includes a set of movements in which the female evaluates the male's reproductive fitness.

Most noctuid moths produce pheromones that attract the opposite sex. Female pheromones that attract males occur widely and have long been studied, but the study of male pheromones has further to go.

Reproduction

Noctuid moths commonly begin the reproductive season from spring to fall, and mostly are multivoltine, such as the eastern panthea moth (Panthea furcilla), which reproduces over the year. Nevertheless, some species have just one brood of offspring (univoltine); among the best known is the lesser yellow underwing (Noctua comes).

Defense

This group has a wide range of both chemical and physical defenses. Among the chemical defenses three types stand out. First, the pyrrolizidine alkaloid sequestration usually present in Arctiinae is also found in a few species of noctuids, including the Spanish moth (Xanthopastis timais). Another chemical defense is formic acid production, which was thought to be present only in Notodontidae, but later was found in caterpillars of Trachosea champa. Finally, the last type of chemical defense is regurgitation of plant compounds, often used by many insects, but the cabbage palm caterpillar (Litoprosopus futilis) produces a toxin called toluquinone that deters predators.

On the other hand, the main physical defense in caterpillars and adults alike is mimicry. Most owlet moths have drab colors with a variety of patterns suitable to camouflage their bodies. The second physical defense consists in thousands of secondary setae that surround the body. The subfamilies that present this mechanism are Pantheinae and Acronictinae. The third is aposematism, represented by species of Cucullinae. Finally, all adults have another mechanism for defense: a tympanal organ available to hear the echolocation spread out by bats, so the moths can avoid them.

Human importance

Agriculture

Many species of owlet moths are considered an agricultural problem around the world. Their larvae are typically known as "cutworms" or "armyworms" due to enormous swarms that destroy crops, orchards and gardens every year. The Old World bollworm (Helicoverpa armigera) produces losses in agriculture every year that exceed US$2 billion. Additionally, the variegated cutworm (Peridroma saucia) is described by many as one of the most damaging pests to vegetables.

In West Africa, species including Busseola fusca, Heliocheilus albipunctella, Sesamia calamistis, Helicoverpa armigera, and Spodoptera exempta are major pests of staple crops such as pearl millet, sorghum, and maize.

Systematics

Since molecular analysis began to play a larger role in systematics, the structure of many Lepidoptera groups has been changing and Noctuidae is not an exception. Most recent studies have shown that Noctuidae sensu stricto is a monophyletic group, mainly based on trifine venation. Some clades within Noctuidae sensu lato have yet to be studied. This taxonomic division represents the subfamilies, tribes and subtribes considered so far.
 Family Noctuidae Latreille, 1809
 Subfamily Acontiinae Guenée, 1841
 Tribe Acontiini Guenée, 1841
 Tribe Armadini
 Tribe Chamaecleini
 Subfamily Acronictinae Harris, 1841
 Subfamily Aediinae
 Subfamily Agaristinae Boisduval, 1833
 Subfamily Amphipyrinae Guenée, 1837
 Tribe Amphipyrini Guenée, 1837
 Tribe Psaphidini Grote, 1896
 Subtribe Feraliina Poole, 1995
 Subtribe Nocloina Poole, 1995
 Subtribe Psaphidina Grote, 1896
 Subtribe Triocnemidina Poole, 1995
 Subfamily Bagisarinae Crumb, 1956
 Subfamily Balsinae Grote, 1896
 Subfamily Bryophilinae Guenée, 1852
 Subfamily Cobubathinae Wagner & Keegan, 2021
 Subfamily Condicinae Poole, 1995
 Tribe Condicini Poole, 1995
 Tribe Leuconyctini Poole, 1995
 Subfamily Cropiinae Keegan & Wagner, 2021
 Subfamily Cuculliinae Herrich-Schäffer, 1850
 Subfamily Dilobinae
 Subfamily Dyopsinae
 Subfamily Eriopinae Herrich-Schäffer, 1851
 Subfamily Eucocytiinae
 Subfamily Eustrotiinae Grote, 1882
 Subfamily Grotellinae
 Subfamily Heliothinae Boisduval, 1828
 Subfamily Metoponiinae Herrich-Schäffer, 1851
 Tribe Cydosiini Kitching & Rawlins, 1998
 Subfamily Noctuinae Latreille, 1809
 Tribe Actinotiini Beck, 1996
 Tribe Apameini Guenée, 1841
 Tribe Arzamini Grote, 1883
 Tribe Caradrinini Boisduval, 1840
 Subtribe Athetiina Fibiger & Lafontaine, 2005
 Subtribe Caradrinina Boisduval, 1840
 Tribe Dypterygiini Forbes, 1954
 Tribe Elaphriini Beck, 1996
 Tribe Episemini
 Tribe Eriopygini Fibiger & Lafontaine, 2005
 Tribe Glottulini Guenée, 1852
 Tribe Hadenini Guenée, 1837
 Tribe Leucaniini Guenée, 1837
 Tribe Noctuini Latreille, 1809
 Subtribe Agrotina Harris, 1841
 Subtribe Axyliina
 Subtribe Noctuina Latreille, 1809
 Tribe Orthosiini Guenée, 1837
 Tribe Phlogophorini Hampson, 1918
 Tribe Phosphilini Poole, 1995
 Tribe Prodeniini Forbes, 1954
 Tribe Pseudeustrotiini Beck, 1996
 Tribe Tholerini Beck, 1996
 Tribe Xylenini Guenée, 1837
 Subtribe Antitypina Forbes & Franclemont, 1954
 Subtribe Cosmiina Guenée, 1852
 Subtribe Ufeina Crumb, 1956
 Subtribe Xylenina Guenée, 1837
 Subfamily Oncocnemidinae Forbes & Franclemont, 1954
 Subfamily Pantheinae Smith, 1898
 Subfamily Plusiinae Boisduval, 1828
 Tribe Abrostolini Eichlin & Cunningham, 1978
 Tribe Argyrogrammatini Eichlin & Cunningham, 1978
 Tribe Plusiini Boisduval, 1828
 Subtribe Autoplusiina Kitching, 1987
 Subtribe Euchalciina Chou & Lu, 1979
 Subtribe Plusiina Boisduval, 1828
 Subfamily Raphiinae
 Subfamily Stiriinae
 Tribe Annaphilini
 Tribe Stiriini Grote, 1882
 Subtribe Annaphilina Mustelin, 2006
 Subtribe Azeniina Poole, 1995
 Subtribe Grotellina Poole, 1995
 Subtribe Stiriina Grote, 1882

Genera with intervening taxonomy not available include:
 Alastria
 Epilitha
 Fabula
 Lanatopyga
 Lenisa
 Neoligia
 Orohadena
 Orthomoia
 Protapamea
 Proxenus
 Pseudluperina

References

External links
On University of Florida Institute of Food and Agricultural Sciences Featured Creatures web site:
 Agrotis ipsilon, black cutworm
 Diphthera festiva, hieroglyphic moth
 Litoprosopus futilis , cabbage palm caterpillar
 Pseudaletia unipuncta, true armyworm
 Spodoptera eridania, southern armyworm
 Spodoptera frugiperda, fall armyworm
 Spodoptera ornithogalli, yellowstriped armyworm
 Xanthopastis timais, Spanish moth or convict caterpillar
 Images of Noctuidae species in New Zealand

 
Moth families